Abraham Josias Sluysken (3 December 1736, Deventer - 18 January 1799, The Hague) was the last Governor of the Dutch Cape Colony before British occupation in 1795. Sluysken was born in the Netherlands, and in 1765 became governor of the Dutch trading colony of Surat on the northwest coast of India. He was sent to the Cape in 1793. With his eye on defense in the case of a possible French attack, Sluysken commissioned the construction of a few small forts at Simon's Town in 1794. The following year, the citizens of Swellendam and Graaff-Reinet revolted and declared their independence from the Cape. At the same time British ships attack the Cape, and while Sluysken attempted to defend the colony against invasion, he had to surrender to the British forces on 14 September 1795. He returned to the Netherlands on 12 November.

Verhaal gehouden bij den Commissaris van de Caap de Goede Hoop, his account of the events that took place between 10 June and 16 September, was published in 1797. Sluysken died on 18 January 1799.

References

1736 births
1799 deaths
18th-century Dutch colonial governors
Governors of the Dutch Cape Colony
People from Deventer